The Hard seat or Semi-cushioned seat, abbreviated YZ, is the cheapest class of seating in China Railway. It is available on non-high-speed trains.

The name of Hard seat derives comes from the hard, wooden seats in the Mao era on regular passenger trains.  Modern "hard seats", however, are upholstered. There are several different tickets and ticket prices that can be obtained. 

Each carriage provides the most basic services common to all Chinese trains, namely toilets, wash basins and a boiling water dispenser. This demonstrates the importance of the ticket prices and the ability for them to change over time.

Compared to soft seat, hard seat carriages have more seats per row (2+3 vs. 2+2) and are usually more crowded, and people without seats may stand in hard seat carriages.

Coaches

The coaches current in use include:
 YZ-21 (no air conditioner)
 YZ-22 (no air conditioner)
 YZ-22B (no air conditioner)
 YZ-25B (no air conditioner)
 YZ-25G
 YZ-25K
 YZ-25T
 YZ-30
 YZ-32
 SYZ-25B (double-decked)
 SYZ-25K (double-decked)

Price

, the following ticket price used in most regular lines, but some special lines have different prices.

References

Passenger rail transport in China